Dicellula is a genus of green algae in the family Chlorellaceae.

References

 

Trebouxiophyceae genera
Monotypic algae genera
Chlorellaceae